Thomas Dunford (born 1988) is a French lutenist. He is the son of American viola da gambist Jonathan Dunford and viola da gambist Sylvia Abramowicz.

He completed his musical studies in 2006 at the Conservatoire de Paris, and earned his bachelor's degree in 2009. He began his performing career as the lutenist in Shakespeare's Twelfth Night on stage at the Comédie Française in 2005

His first solo CD Lachrimae, recorded for the Alpha label in 2012, was awarded the Caecilia prize in 2013. BBC Music Magazine called him the “Eric Clapton of the lute”. His second CD Labirinto d’Amore was awarded the «Choc» by Classica magazine. He plays with a number of ensembles including Les Arts Florissants, the Centre de Musique Baroque de Versailles, Le Concert Spirituel, and Le Concert d'Astrée as well as performing solo and with other leading artists.

References

1988 births
French classical mandolinists
French jazz musicians
French performers of early music
French lutenists
Living people